Paul Michael Ritchie (born 25 January 1969) is a Scottish former football player, who played for several clubs in Scotland, England, Northern Ireland and Hong Kong in a 20-year career.

He was voted Scottish PFA Second Division Player of the Year and won the Daily Record Golden Shot award (first player to reach 30 goals in the SFL) in 1996–97.

References

External links 

Happy Valley 1995–96 squad

1969 births
Brechin City F.C. players
Derry City F.C. players
League of Ireland players
Dundee F.C. players
East Fife F.C. players
Association football forwards
Gillingham F.C. players
Scottish expatriate sportspeople in Hong Kong
Hamilton Academical F.C. players
Happy Valley AA players
Hong Kong First Division League players
Inverness Caledonian Thistle F.C. players
Living people
Partick Thistle F.C. players
Scottish footballers
Yee Hope players
Scottish expatriate footballers
Scottish Football League players
Expatriate footballers in Hong Kong
Lochee United F.C. managers
Scottish football managers
Sportspeople from St Andrews
Hong Kong League XI representative players
Scottish Junior Football Association players
Footballers from Fife